

Bracket

See also
 The Summit League men's basketball tournament

2003–04 Mid-Continent Conference men's basketball season
Summit League men's basketball tournament
Mid-Continent
2004 in sports in Missouri